Thamsanqa Shabalala (born September 29, 1974) is a member of Ladysmith Black Mambazo, a South African choral group founded in 1960 by his father Joseph. He replaced Joseph as the group's lead singer after his father's retirement in 2015 (see main article for more information).

Thamsanqa was born in Ladysmith (eMnambithi district) to Joseph and his late wife Nellie. In 1976, Joseph brought together his six sons to form Mshengu White Mambazo, Ladysmith's 'junior choir'.

After the murder of his uncle Headman Shabalala in December 1991 and the retirement of several other members a friend called Geophrey Mdletshe and Thamsanqa Shabalala uncle Ben Shabalala), Joseph later recruited Thamsanqa and his brothers Sibongiseni, Thulani and Msizi. Thamsanqa began singing with the group as an alto voice (alongside Albert Mazibuko, who is a tenor voice) and has remained in the line-up since 1993.

Together with his brother Sibongiseni and a well-known South African guitarist, Maqhinga Radebe, Thamsanqa formed the maskandi-mbaqanga-isicathamiya crossover band Shabalala Rhythm in 1998, which has released successful releases to date including Ubuhle Bakho (2003), Vuma (2005), and Izingqaku (2007).

It was announced by Joseph Shabalala in January 2008 that when he retires, Thamsanqa will take over as leader of Ladysmith Black Mambazo. Joseph Shabalala retired in 2015.

References

Ladysmith Black Mambazo members
21st-century South African male singers
1977 births
Living people
People from Ladysmith, KwaZulu-Natal